Polythlipta euroalis is a moth in the family Crambidae. It was described by Charles Swinhoe in 1889. It is found in north-eastern India, as well as in northern Australia.

References

Spilomelinae
Moths described in 1889